Helmsman Holk (German:Steuermann Holk) is a 1920 German silent drama film directed by Rochus Gliese and Ludwig Wolff and starring Asta Nielsen and Paul Wegener.

Cast
In alphabetical order
 Theodor Loos as Jacon Siebensee  
 Hans Marr as Steuermann Timm  
 Asta Nielsen as Lulu  
 Lyda Salmonova 
 Charlotte Schultz as Doris, Holms Braut  
 Rosa Valetti as Greta Grien  
 Paul Wegener as Steuermann Holk

References

Bibliography
 Jennifer M. Kapczynski & Michael D. Richardson. A New History of German Cinema.

External links

1920 films
Films of the Weimar Republic
Films directed by Rochus Gliese
Films directed by Ludwig Wolff
German silent feature films
UFA GmbH films
German black-and-white films
1920 drama films
German drama films
Silent drama films
1920s German films